Trithemis longistyla is a species of dragonfly in the family Libellulidae. It is endemic to the Democratic Republic of the Congo. Little is known about the species.

References

longistyla
Insects of the Democratic Republic of the Congo
Endemic fauna of the Democratic Republic of the Congo
Insects described in 1953
Taxonomy articles created by Polbot